The FMA AeC.1 was a light utility aircraft built in Argentina in 1931; it was the first aircraft of domestic design to be produced by Fabrica Militar de Aviones (FMA). It was a low-wing cantilever monoplane of conventional configuration with fixed tailskid undercarriage. As originally designed, the fully enclosed cabin had three seats, but this was later reduced to two. The passenger seat could be readily removed to make way for a stretcher to facilitate its use as an air ambulance.

Specifications

References

External links

1930s Argentine civil utility aircraft
FMA aircraft